Jake Scott (1945–2020), American football safety

Jake Scott may also refer to:
 Jake Scott (director) (born 1965), British film director
 Jake Scott (guard) (born 1981), former American football guard
 Jake Scott (musician)

See also
 Scott (surname)
 Scott (disambiguation)